David Ross (born November 18, 1959) is a former American football player and coach.  He was most recently an assistant coach for the UTSA Roadrunners football team.  Ross served as the head football coach at Bacone College from 2001 to 2005, compiling a record of 27–26.  He has also served as head football coach at the junior college and high school levels.

Coaching career

Early years
Ross began his coaching career at Northeastern Oklahoma A&M Junior College in Miami, Oklahoma in 1982 after graduating from Central Methodist College in Fayette, Missouri. Ross was then hired by Jimmy Johnson (Oklahoma State, Miami, Dallas Cowboys, Miami Dolphins) in 1984 where his association with Larry Coker began.  Coker is now the head coach at UTSA.  Ross left Oklahoma State to become the assistant head coach/defensive coordinator at his college alma mater in 1987.  In 1988 Ross was hired to be the head football coach at his high school alma mater, William Chrisman High School and inherited a 30-game losing streak, at that time the longest in the nation.  In 1992 Ross was hired as the first head football coach at Blue Springs South High School, starting his first program from scratch and took the team to an 11–1 record in its third year, losing in the state quarterfinals.  In 1995 Ross was hired to rebuild a struggling Kemper Military Junior College program in Boonville, Missouri.  Ross put 42 players in Division I football and 7 players to the NFL.

Bacone
Coach Ross was the first head football coach for the Bacone Warriors located in Muskogee, Oklahoma and he held that position for five seasons, from 2001 until 2005.  His coaching record at Bacone was 27–26.

College assistant coaching
Ross departed Bacone College in 2006 to be an assistant at Illinois State, coaching cornerbacks for all three years while later serving as defensive coordinator.

Head coaching record

College

References

1959 births
Living people
American football defensive backs
American football quarterbacks
Bacone Warriors football coaches
Central Methodist Eagles football coaches
Central Methodist Eagles football players
Illinois State Redbirds football coaches
UTSA Roadrunners football coaches
High school football coaches in Missouri
Junior college football coaches in the United States
Sportspeople from Independence, Missouri